Fusioolithus is an oogenus of dinosaur egg. It contains two oospecies: F. baghensis and F. berthei. Fossils have been found in Spain, Argentina, France, India and Peru. They were probably laid by a titanosaur.

F. baghensis eggs may be up to 20 centimeters in diameter and up to 1.7 mm thick. F. berthei eggs have never been found intact, however, they are up to twice as thick as F. baghensis eggs.

References 

Dinosaur fossils
Dinosaur reproduction